Kakwa Provincial Park and Protected Area is a 170,890 ha provincial park in northeastern British Columbia, Canada. The park preserves the southernmost portion of the Hart Ranges and the northernmost portion of the Continental Ranges. The park also preserves significant marine fossil deposits located in the region.

Geography
The Kakwa River originates in Kakwa Lake, at the core of the park. It is named for Kakwa, the Cree word for porcupine.

The tallest mountains are Mount Sir Alexander (3270 m) and Mount Ida (3189 m).

Recreation
Fishing in Kakwa Lake is permitted. Snowmobiling is permitted on trails, meadows, and along mountain sides.

Kakwa Provincial Park is also the Northern terminus of the Great Divide Trail, running from the US border at Waterton Lakes National Park to a trailhead on the Walker Creek Forest Service Road.

See also
List of British Columbia Provincial Parks

References

British Columbia. Ministry of Employment and Investment (March 1999). Dawson Creek Land & Resource Management Plan, p.44.

External links

Parks in the Canadian Rockies
Northern Interior of British Columbia
Provincial parks of British Columbia
1987 establishments in British Columbia
Protected areas established in 1987